John Benjamin Sharples (born 26 January 1973) is an English former footballer who played as a midfielder. Born in Bury, Lancashire, he played for Manchester United, Hearts, Ayr United and York City in the 1990s.

References

External links

1973 births
Living people
Footballers from Bury, Greater Manchester
English footballers
Association football midfielders
Manchester United F.C. players
Heart of Midlothian F.C. players
Ayr United F.C. players
York City F.C. players
Scottish Football League players
English Football League players